WKKT (96.9 FM) is a country music radio station in Charlotte, North Carolina. The station is licensed to the northern suburb of Statesville, North Carolina  Owned by iHeartMedia, its transmitter is located in Mooresville, North Carolina, and its studios are located in the Wood Ridge Center complex off Billy Graham Parkway in South Charlotte.

WKKT broadcasts in the HD Radio format.

In the Boone area, WKKT is subject to co-channel interference from WXBQ-FM, licensed to Bristol, Virginia. The transmitters of the two stations are less than 100 miles apart, and WXBQ broadcasts with an effective radiated power of 75,000 watts.

History
The station on 96.9 FM in Statesville, North Carolina began in 1967 as WDBM-FM, and was largely the simulcast partner to co-owned daytime station WDBM (now with the call sign WAME). The station's original owner was Walter B. Duke, and the call letters supposedly stood for "Walter Duke's Beautiful Music" station. WDBM-FM continued to broadcast in the evenings after the AM station signed off.

The Duke family sold the stations in 1973, and the new owners separated the operations of the AM and FM, and programmed the FM station as a rock-oriented Underground format, changing the call letters to WOOO and the station's slogan to "Triple-O-97".

In 1980, Metrolina Communications of Orlando, Florida bought WOOO and WDBM for $660,000. The new owners planned to continue the adult contemporary format on WOOO, along with new calls, WLVV. The station increased power from 9000 to 100,000 watts with a new tower near Lake Norman which, if it had worked properly, would have allowed it to cover Charlotte. The change to "Love 97" happened February 3, 1981. Its initial format under the new call letters was "contemporary beautiful music" using an automated system called "The FM100 Plan", but later changed to Churchill Productions' "Radio One", a soft adult contemporary format. Popular announcers on the station in those years included Phil Green, Bob Brandon, Bob Chrysler, Dan Lucas, Dick Durante and Anne Cruse.

WLVV finally reached full power in November 1981 and began showing up in Charlotte ratings. Capitol Broadcasting bought WLVV for $2 million along with WDRV in 1982. At the time, WLVV played Journey, The Dirt Band, The Pointer Sisters, Kenny Rogers and Hall & Oates.

Another ownership change and a switch to country came in 1985, along with new call letters WLVK ("K-97"). In January 1989, Bill Blevins, using the on-air name Billy Buck, became the new morning host to compete with Charlotte's top DJ, Bill Dollar.

On March 23, 1990, the station switched to a "high-octane country" format as WTDR ("Thunder 96.9"), with the first song "If You Don't Like Hank Williams" by Hank Williams Jr. Research showed many male listeners who liked country music also listened to album rock WRFX. Program director Mark Tudor said the previous target audience was 25-54, while the new audience was 21-37, specifically a median age of 33. The playlist included more newer hits and less gold. Rock songs in the new format included "Move It On Over" by George Thorogood and "Sharp Dressed Man" by ZZ Top. Kenny Rogers, Crystal Gayle and Anne Murray were no longer played, though Ronnie Milsap's "Smoky Mountain Rain" and George Jones' "He Stopped Loving Her Today" were acceptable. Liners included "Slammin' the Door on the Same Old Country" (referring to WSOC-FM), "Country Without the Restrictor Plate" and "Playing What You Asked for 'Cause No One Else Will". That experiment didn't last long, and the station went back to all-country under the moniker "New Country 96.9." However, the WTDR calls remained for a while.

Chuck Boozer returned to mornings in Charlotte in 1994 on WTDR after working afternoons at KPLX in Dallas, Texas.

The call letters were changed to the current WKKT in 1997. Along with the new calls came a new nickname, "96.9 Kat Kountry." In December 1997, Paul Schadt moved to WKKT after 16 years at WSOC.

In Fall 2000, Kat Country was ranked 5th in Charlotte, while former top-rated WSOC-FM sank to 12th place. In 2001, the station adopted its current nickname, "96.9 the Kat."

Jingles and sweepers
Station voice: Emily Mcintosh, John WillyardStation jingles: YoungGuns Studios

References

External links
Official website

Country radio stations in the United States
KKT
Radio stations established in 1967
1967 establishments in North Carolina
IHeartMedia radio stations